A by-election was held for the New South Wales Legislative Assembly electorate of Cumberland South Riding on 12 June 1856 because William Manning resigned in May 1857 due to ill-health.

Dates

Result

William Manning resigned on account of ill-health.

See also
Electoral results for the district of Cumberland (South Riding)
List of New South Wales state by-elections

References

1857 elections in Australia
New South Wales state by-elections
1850s in New South Wales